Ricardo Miguel Coelho Fernandes (born 29 September 1991 in Funchal, Madeira) is a Portuguese footballer who plays for C.S.D. Câmara de Lobos as a midfielder.

External links

Ricardo Fernandes at ZeroZero

1991 births
Living people
Sportspeople from Funchal
Portuguese footballers
Madeiran footballers
Association football midfielders
Primeira Liga players
Liga Portugal 2 players
Segunda Divisão players
C.S. Marítimo players
C.D. Nacional players
C.F. União players
A.D. Camacha players